Kingstown is a town in Cleveland County, North Carolina, United States. The population was 681 at the 2010 census.

History
Named in honor of Martin Luther King Jr., Kingstown was incorporated in 1989.  The town was originally known as "Kingston," but adopted its current name to avoid confusion with Kinston, North Carolina.

Geography
Kingstown is located at  (35.358757, -81.617501).

Demographics

2020 census

As of the 2020 United States census, there were 656 people, 194 households, and 135 families residing in the town.

2000 census
As of the census of 2000, there were 845 people, 258 households, and 210 families residing in the town. The population density was 480.0 people per square mile (185.4/km2). There were 273 housing units at an average density of 155.1 per square mile (59.9/km2). The racial makeup of the town was 4.38% White, 92.78% African American, 1.18% Asian, 0.95% from other races, and 0.71% from two or more races. Hispanic or Latino of any race were 1.42% of the population.

There were 258 households, out of which 30.2% had children under the age of 18 living with them, 47.7% were married couples living together, 29.1% had a female householder with no husband present, and 18.6% were non-families. 17.1% of all households were made up of individuals, and 5.4% had someone living alone who was 65 years of age or older. The average household size was 3.24 and the average family size was 3.59.

In the town, the population was spread out, with 31.6% under the age of 18, 9.8% from 18 to 24, 22.8% from 25 to 44, 26.5% from 45 to 64, and 9.2% who were 65 years of age or older. The median age was 33 years. For every 100 females, there were 87.4 males. For every 100 females age 18 and over, there were 84.1 males.

The median income for a household in the town was $32,054, and the median income for a family was $33,281. Males had a median income of $24,583 versus $20,903 for females. The per capita income for the town was $11,956. About 18.4% of families and 17.8% of the population were below the poverty line, including 18.7% of those under age 18 and 18.4% of those age 65 or over.

References

Towns in North Carolina
Towns in Cleveland County, North Carolina